The Scoliopterygini are a tribe of moths in the family Erebidae.

Genera
Ossonoba
Scoliopteryx

References

Scoliopteryginae
Moth tribes